Vladislav Valeryevich Teplyakov (born 23 July 2004) is a Russian footballer who plays as a left back for Krylia Sovetov Samara.

Career
Teplyakov made his debut for the senior team of Krylia Sovetov Samara on 30 August 2022 in a Russian Cup game against Spartak Moscow.

Career statistics

References

External links
 
 
 
 

2004 births
Living people
Russian footballers
Association football defenders
PFC Krylia Sovetov Samara players